Patrick Francis Cassidy (22 March 1915 – 5 January 1990) was a United States Army officer who served in World War II.

Military career
While serving as commander of 1st Battalion, 502nd Parachute Infantry Regiment in the Battle of Carentan Lieutenant colonel Cassidy was awarded the Distinguished Service Cross. During the Battle of Bastogne he served as executive officer of the 502nd Parachute Infantry Regiment.

In 1963 Brigadier general Cassidy commanded XVIII Airborne Corps.

Major general Cassidy commanded the 8th Infantry Division from April 1966 to June 1968. In August 1967 he was awarded the Military Medal, Luxembourg's highest military honor.

He served as Chief of Personnel Operations from February 1968 to June 1969.

Lieutenant general Cassidy served as commander of I Corps from 8 August 1969 to 26 July 1970.

In October 1971 he was appointed commander of Fifth United States Army.

In January 1973 he acted as commander of escorts for the memorial service for former President Harry S. Truman at Washington National Cathedral.

References

People from Pendleton, Oregon
United States Army generals
1915 births
1990 deaths
United States Army personnel of World War II
Recipients of the Distinguished Service Cross (United States)